Hudinja is a district along the Hudinja in the northern part of Celje, Slovenia. Hudinja consists of two informal parts: Spodnja Hudinja (literally, 'Lower Hudinja') and Zgornja Hudinja (literally, 'Upper Hudinja'). It is named after the Hudinja River, a tributary of the Savinja, which flows through it. Zgornja Hudinja was an independent settlement until 1982.

A modern sports center was recently built in Hudinja. The main buildings are the Arena Petrol football stadium (built between 1999 and 2003) and the Zlatorog Arena.

References

External links
 Information on the home page of the Municipality of Celje

Geography of Celje
Districts of the City Municipality of Celje